Chan Fat Chi (born 10 January 1957) is a former Hong Kong professional footballer who played as a forward.

Career
He played for Bulova, Seiko, South China and Instant-Dict. He was the Hong Kong Footballer of the Year in 1988 and 1989. He played in the famous Hong Kong victory over China on 19 May 1985.

References 

Living people
1957 births
Hong Kong First Division League players
Bulova SA players
Seiko SA players
South China AA players
Double Flower FA players
Association football forwards
Hong Kong footballers
Hong Kong international footballers